Locri Cathedral is a Roman Catholic cathedral dedicated to the Virgin Mary in the city of Locri, in Calabria, Italy. Since 1954 it has been the seat of the bishops of Gerace-Locri, now the bishops of Locri-Gerace.

The church building, in the Lombard Romanesque style, was built in 1933 by order of Mgr. Giorgio Delrio, bishop of Gerace (1906-1920).

The interior, on a Latin cross groundplan, has three aisles: the two side aisles terminate in small chapels. The central part of the north aisle contains a marble sculpture depicting Bishop Francesco Saverio Mangeruva (1872-1905) and the sarcophagus of Bishop Michele Alberto Arduino (1962-1972).

See also
Catholic Church in Italy

References

External links 
 Diocese of Locri-Gerace official website 
 GCatholic.org

Roman Catholic cathedrals in Italy
Cathedrals in Calabria
Churches in the province of Reggio Calabria
Roman Catholic churches completed in 1933
20th-century Roman Catholic church buildings in Italy